The Jardwadjali (Yartwatjali), also known as the Jaadwa, are an Aboriginal Australian people of the state of Victoria, whose traditional lands occupy the lands in the upper Wimmera River watershed east to Gariwerd (Grampians) and west to Lake Bringalbert.

Language
The Jardwadjali language was mutually intelligible with Djab wurrung, with which it shared shares 90 percent of common vocabulary. Sub-dialects include Jagwadjali, Mardidjali, and Nundadjali.

Country
Norman Tindale located the Jardwadjali at Horsham and the Upper Wimmera River. The western borders lay as far as Mount Arapiles and Mount Talbot, while their eastern frontier went beyond Glenorchy and Stawell. They went north as far as around Warracknabeal and Lake Buloke. He also adds that by the time white colonization began, they had penetrated south almost to Casterton and Hamilton.

Social organization
The Jardwadjali were divided into several hordes.
 Djappuminyou (a horde);
 Bulukwuro (centered around Lake Buloke),
 Portbulluc (around Mount Zero)
 Murra-murrabarap (around Glenorchy).

Lake Buloke was used as the site where several tribes travelled joined the Jardwadjali in order to conduct ceremonies.

History

It was originally thought that areas of traditional Jardwadjali land showed signs of human occupation dating back no more than 5,000 years. Recent research has established a longer timeframe, from the late Pleistocene to the Holocene, where the record of habitation becomes much richer. Archaeological evidence of occupation in Gariwerd many thousands of years before the last ice-age. One site in the Victoria Range (Billawin Range) has been dated from 22,000 years ago.

It is likely that first contact with Europeans was through smallpox epidemics which arrived with the First Fleet in 1788 and rapidly spread through the trading networks of indigenous Australians and killed many people in two waves before the 1830s. One Wotjobaluk account called the disease thinba micka and that it killed large numbers of people, and disfigured many more with pock-marked faces, and came down the Murray River sent by malevolent sorcerers to the north. According to Norman Tindale, by the time white incursion began, the Jaadwa were on the move southwards, almost as far as Casterton and Hamilton.

Conflict and dispossession
In 1836 the squatter Edward Henty was exploring Jardwadjali land from the south, the start of the European invasion. A further wave of European occupation occurred from the north in 1840 with Lieutenant Robert Briggs squatting near Lake Lonsdale.

The explorer Major Thomas Mitchell passed through the lands of the Jardwadjali people in 1836 and named many geographical features, including the Grampian mountains which he named after the range of mountains in Scotland. The Jardwadjali called these mountains Gariwerd, gar meaning 'pointed mountain'; i  meaning 'the' and werd meaning 'shoulder'.

To the Jardwadjali and Djab Wurrung peoples Gariwerd was central to the dreaming of the creator, Bunjil, and buledji Brambimbula, the two Bram brothers, who were responsible for the creation and naming of many landscape features in western Victoria.

Jardwadjali people formed the nucleus of the Australian Aboriginal cricket team in England in 1868, although efforts were made by the Central Board for the Protection of Aborigines to stop the tour. The team played 47 matches, winning 14, losing 14, and drawing 19 games.

There were no aboriginal missions established in Jardwadjali territory, so by the 1860s and 1870s many Jardwadjali were forced to locate at Ebenezer Mission in Wergaia country on the Wimmera River, and at Lake Condah mission in Dhauwurd Wurrung country.

Massacres
Settlement was marked by resistance to the invasion often by driving off or stealing cows which then resulted in conflict and sometimes a massacre of aboriginal people.

Very few of these reports were acted upon to bring the settlers to court. After the massacre at Fighting Hills, John Whyte travelled to Melbourne to inform Governor La Trobe in person of the massacre. The depositions of the Aboriginal Protector Charles Sievwright who had personally investigated the massacre were disallowed. No trial was ever held. At the time aborigines were denied the right to give evidence in courts of law. The incidents listed below are just the cases that have been reported; it is likely other incidents occurred that were never reported and not documented officially. Neil Black, a squatter in Western Victoria writing on 9 December 1839 states the prevailing attitude of many settlers:

'The best way [to procure a run] is to go outside and take up a new run, provided the conscience of the party is sufficiently seared to enable him without remorse to slaughter natives right and left. It is universally and distinctly understood that the chances are very small indeed of a person taking up a new run being able to maintain possession of his place and property without having recourse to such means -- sometimes by wholesale...'

George Robinson, the Chief Protector of Aborigines wrote in his journal in 1841 referring to the Portland Bay area where the Whyte Brothers had settled:

 "The settlers at the Bay spoke of the settlers up the country dropping the natives as coolly as if they were speaking of dropping cows. Indeed, the doctrine is being promulgated that they are not human, or hardly so and thereby inculcating the principle that killing them is no murder"

Table: reported massacres in Jardwadjali country to 1859

Recent history
In 1989 there was a proposal by Victorian Minister for Tourism, Steve Crabb to rename many geographical place names associated with aboriginal heritage in the area. There was much opposition to this proposal by European descendants. The Brambuk centre, representing five aboriginal communities, advocated a dual name for the main area: Gariwerd/Grampians.
Some of the changes included:
 Grampians to Gariwerd (mountain range)
 Mount Zero to Mura Mura (little hill)
 Hall's Gap to Budja Budja

The Brambuk National Park and Cultural Centre in Halls Gap is owned and managed by Jardwadjali and Djab Wurrung people from five Aboriginal communities with historic links to the Gariwerd-Grampians ranges and the surrounding plains.

Native Title recognition

The indigenous peoples of the Wimmera won native title recognition on 13 December 2005 after a ten-year legal process. Descendants of the Jardwadjali had a partial recognition in 2005 of their land rights when a settlement was arranged, which included also the Wotjobaluk, Wergaia and Jupagalk, returning freehold title over a number of areas was transferred back to the traditional owners.

It was the first successful native title claim in south-eastern Australia and in Victoria, determined by Justice Ron Merkel. In his reasons for judgement Justice Merkel explained the significance of his orders:

"The orders I propose to make are of special significance as they constitute the first recognition and protection of native title resulting in the ongoing enjoyment of native title in the State of Victoria and, it would appear, on the South-Eastern seaboard of Australia. These are areas in which the Aboriginal peoples suffered severe and extensive dispossession, degradation and devastation as a consequence of the establishment of British sovereignty over their lands and waters during the 19th century."

Notable members
 Unaarriman, better known in cricket circles as Johnny Mullagh was born around 1843, was a Jardwadjali.

Alternative names

 Boolucburer
 Brapkut (name of speech of southern hordes)
 Dallundeer (of Wembawemba),
 Ja:rewe
 Knen-knen-wurrong
 Knenkorenwurro
 Knindowurrong (i.e., clear speakers, term claimed by several tribes), Knindowurong,
 Milangburn
 Morton Plains tribe
 Mukja:dwen
 Mukjarawaint
 Nandatjali (language name [nanda = good, jali = speech])
 Ngengenwuru
 Ngenngen-wurro
 Nundatyalli
 Yarawain
 Yardwa-tyalli
 Yartwur

Source:

Some words
 daruaj (man).

Notes

Citations

Sources

Aboriginal peoples of Victoria (Australia)
History of Victoria (Australia)